Al-Ashraf al-Qibliyya Al-Ashraf al-Qibliyya is a village belonging to Qena Governorate in the Arab Republic of Egypt. According to the statistics for the year 2020, the total population of the tribal Ashraf reached 19,853 people, including 10,120 men and 9,715 women.

is a village belonging to Qena Governorate in the Arab Republic of Egypt. According to the statistics for the year 2020, the total population of the tribal Ashraf reached 19,853 people, including 10,120 men and 9,715 women.

Transportation 
Qena has a network of streets, roads and highways with greenery and flowered pavements. From the city there is a road that crosses the Eastern Desert to port Safaga on the Red Sea.

The United States Air Force conducted classified operations from Wadi Qena airfield from the 1970s to the 1990s, under the code names Coronet Scabbard, Coronel Aspen, Coronet Drake, and Coronet Mallard. The 4401st Combat Support Squadron (Provisional) maintained a near-constant CENTAF presence there. Part of these operations probably included Lockheed MC-130 flights during the Desert One rescue attempts for the U.S. hostages in Tehran in the late 1970s.

See also 

 List of cities and towns in Egypt
 Dendera
 Luxor

References

External links 

 Early Morning Qena – a short film on Qena

Governorate capitals in Egypt
Populated places in Qena Governorate
Cities in Egypt
Medieval cities of Egypt